Seqin Saray (also Romanized as Seqīn Sarāy; also known as Sekān Saray and Seqīn Sarā) is a village in Mehranrud-e Markazi Rural District, in the Central District of Bostanabad County, East Azerbaijan Province, Iran. At the 2006 census, its population was 2,272, in 357 families.

References 

Populated places in Bostanabad County